The 2016 UK Music Video Awards were held on 20 October 2016 to recognise the best in music videos from United Kingdom and worldwide. The nominations were announced on 21 September 2016. English musician Jamie XX won Video of the Year with "Gosh",  directed by Romain Gavras.

Video of the Year

Special awards

Video genre categories

Craft and technical categories

Live and interactive categories

Individual and company categories

References

External links
Official website

UK Music Video Awards
UK Music Video Awards
UK Music Video Awards